The 1976 United States men's Olympic basketball team represented the United States at the 1976 Summer Olympics in Montreal, Quebec, Canada. The U.S. team won its eighth gold medal, out of the previous nine Summer Olympic Games.

Roster

1976 USA results
 beat , 106–86
 beat , 95–94
 beat , 112–93
 beat , 2–0 (forfeit)
 beat , 81–76
 beat , 95–77
 beat , 95–74
Team Record: 7–0

1976 Olympic Games final standings

1.  (7–0)
2.  (5–2)
3.  (6–1)
4.  (4–3)
5.  (5–2)
6.  (3–4)
7.  (4–3)
8.  (2–5)
9.  (3–4)
10.  (1–5)
11.  (0–6)
12.  (0–5)

See also
Basketball at the 1976 Summer Olympics

References

External links
 USA Basketball, official site

United States at the Olympic men's basketball tournament
United States
olympic